Peruvanam Kuttan Marar is a chenda artist. He leads several popular traditional orchestra performances in Kerala. He received Padma Shri, India's third highest civilian award, in 2011 for his contributions in the field of art.

Early life

Peruvanam Kuttan Marar was born to a family of chenda artists in Peruvanam, Thrissur, Kerala. His grandfather, Peruvanam Narayana Marar and his father, Peruvanam Appu Marar were also well-known chenda artists. His teachers include his father, Kumarapuram Appu Marar and Sreenarayanapuram Appu Marar.  He made his debut with Chenda at the age of 10. He performed at festivals in nearby temples including Peruvanam Mahadeva Temple.  He also joined as a clerk in C N N Boys' High School, Cherpu at the age of 20.

Career as an artist

Kuttan Marar features in prominent temple festivals of Kerala including Thrissur Pooram, Peruvanam pooram, Kollam Pooram and those at Guruvayur Temple.   He leads the famous Ilanjithara Melam of Thrissur Pooram. Kuttan Marar started performing at the Ilanjithara Melam from 1977 and has been its Pramani since 1999.

(Partial) listing of temples where Peruvanam Kuttan Marar has performed :
 puthucode Bhaghavathy temple
Puthur Thirupuraikal Bhagavathy Temple
 Panangad Sri Maha Ganapathi Temple
 Thripunithura Poornathrayeesa temple
 Vaikom Mahadeva temple
 Guruvayur temple
 Pallathamkullangara Bhagavathy temple, Ernakulam
 Ilankunnapuzha temple, Ernakulam
 Kuttanelloor temple, Thrissur
 Manalaarukaavu temple, Thrissur
 Puzhakkarakkavu temple, Moovattupuzha
 Paramekkavu temple
 Vadakkumnathan temple
 Cherpu Bagavathi temple, Cherpu
 Thamarakulangara temple, Tripunithura
 Kottaram Bhagavathy temple. Maradu
 Ernakulam temple
 Peruvanam temple
 Aarattupuzha temple
 Chinakathoor temple
 Malliyoor Sree Maha Ganapathy Temple
 Irinjalakuda temple
 Kodunthirapully Durgasthami & Mahanavami Navaratri Fest, Palakkad
 Cherpulasshery Bhagavathy temple
 Paliam Siva Temple
 Sree Mahadheva Temple, Rajakkad
 Pilakkad Sree Ramankulangara Ayyappa Temple
 Thiruvarppu Sree Krishna Swamy temple, Kottayam
(Partial) listing of artists who perform with Peruvanam Kuttan Marar on a regular basis :

 Tiruvalla Radhakrishnan
 Peruvanam Satheeshan Marar
 Kelath Aravindakshan Marar
 Pazhuvil Raghu Marar
 Chowalloor Mohanan Nair
 Chowalloor Mohanan Warrier
 Peruvanam Karthik Marar

 Anthikkad Ramachandran
 Anthikkad Padmanbhan
 Peruvanam Sankaranarayanan
 Peruvanam Shivan 
 Peruvanam Prakashan
 Peruvanam Krishnan
 Maniyamparambil Mani Nair
 Kizhoot Nandanan

In popular culture
C. Venugopal and K. Ramachandran produced a 45 minute documentary on Kuttan Marar, named Pranathi.

Awards

 Keli Melasooryan Award 2012
 Sangeetha Nataka Academy Fellowship 2012
 Pallavoor Puraskaram 2012
 Padma Shri award in 2011
 Kerala Sangeetha Nataka Akademi Fellowship in 2010
 Kerala Sangeetha Nataka Akademi Award 2001
 Veerashringhala 2000
 Arattupuzha Sri Sastha Award
 Sri Guruvayurappan Award
 Keli's promising Artist Award 1999
 Keli's Golden Conch 2005
 Keli's Lifetime achievement Award 2009 
 Kala Darpana Award
 Nada Purnathrayee Award
 Adaraneeyam Award
 Mela Kala Chakravarti 
 Vadyotama Award
 Melakalanidhi

External links 
 A rare photo of peruvanam kuttan marar and kalamandalam paramesweran marar. https://picasaweb.google.com/102849838474285473343/January142012#5697344962166509490

References

Recipients of the Padma Shri in arts
Living people
1953 births
People from Thrissur district
Chenda players
Indian percussionists
Musicians from Kerala
Indian male musicians
20th-century Indian musicians
20th-century drummers
20th-century male musicians
Recipients of the Sangeet Natak Akademi Award
Recipients of the Kerala Sangeetha Nataka Akademi Fellowship
Recipients of the Kerala Sangeetha Nataka Akademi Award